Stenidea pilosa is a species of beetle in the family Cerambycidae. It was described by Thomas Vernon Wollaston in 1862 and is known from the Canary Islands.

References

pilosa
Beetles described in 1862